Qasemabad-e Olya (also Romanized as Qāsemābād-e ‘Olyā; also known as Qāsemābād) is a village in Hakimabad Rural District, in the Central District of Zarandieh County, Markazi Province, Iran. At the 2006 census, its population was 587, in 177 families.

References 

Populated places in Zarandieh County